The Hollow Men is a poem by T. S. Eliot.

The Hollow Men may also refer to:
The Hollow Men (band), a British rock band
The Hollow Men (book), book by Nicky Hager about New Zealand politics
The Hollow Men (film), a documentary film directed by Alister Barry, based on the book by Nicky Hager about New Zealand politics
The Hollow Men (comedy troupe), a British comedy troupe
The Hollow Men (Doctor Who), a Doctor Who novel named after the poem
 "The Hollow Men" (Dollhouse), a 2010 episode of the Dollhouse TV series
The Hollowmen, an Australian comedy series on ABC1

See also
 The Hollow Man (disambiguation)